Cecilia Elizabeth Biagioli (born 3 January 1985 in Córdoba, Argentina) is an Olympic and national record-holding swimmer from Argentina. She swam for Argentina at the 2000, 2004, 2008 and 2012 Olympics. She represented Argentina at the 2020 Summer Olympics.

Career 
At the 2009 World Championship she set the South American Record in the 400 free (4:10.16).

At the 2011 Pan American Games she won the gold medal in the open water swimming 10km event.

In 2019, she won the silver medal in the women's marathon 10 kilometres at the 2019 Pan American Games held in Lima, Peru.

Family 
Her sister is triathlete Romina Biagioli.

References

External links

1985 births
Living people
Argentine female long-distance swimmers
Swimmers at the 2000 Summer Olympics
Swimmers at the 2004 Summer Olympics
Swimmers at the 2007 Pan American Games
Swimmers at the 2008 Summer Olympics
Swimmers at the 2011 Pan American Games
Swimmers at the 2012 Summer Olympics
Swimmers at the 2019 Pan American Games
Swimmers at the 2020 Summer Olympics
Olympic swimmers of Argentina
Pan American Games gold medalists for Argentina
Pan American Games medalists in swimming
South American Games gold medalists for Argentina
South American Games silver medalists for Argentina
South American Games bronze medalists for Argentina
South American Games medalists in swimming
Competitors at the 2002 South American Games
Competitors at the 2006 South American Games
Competitors at the 2010 South American Games
Competitors at the 2014 South American Games
Medalists at the 2011 Pan American Games
Medalists at the 2019 Pan American Games
Sportspeople from Córdoba, Argentina
20th-century Argentine women
21st-century Argentine women